Frederick Johnson may refer to:
Frederick Johnson (writer), American daytime serial writer
Frederick A. Johnson (1833–1893), United States Representative from New York
Frederick Henry Johnson (1890–1917), Victoria Cross recipient
Frederick Johnson (businessman), British-Canadian businessman with the Bell Telephone Company of Canada
Frederick Johnson (footballer) (1876–?), English footballer
Frederick Johnson (Oxford University cricketer) (born 1990), English cricketer
Frederick Johnson (politician) (1917–1993), Canadian politician and lawyer
Frederick Johnson (Surrey cricketer) (1851–1923), English cricketer
Frederick Johnson (tennis) (1891–1963), American tennis player, teacher and coach
Frederick Foote Johnson (1866–1943), bishop of the Episcopal Diocese of Missouri
Frederick Morrissey Johnson (1932–2003), member of the Canadian House of Commons
Frederick Johnson, one of the Johnson Brothers tableware manufacturers

See also
Fred Johnson (disambiguation)
Frederick Johnston (disambiguation)
Frederick Johnstone (disambiguation)